Chrysocrambus sardiniellus is a species of moth in the family Crambidae. It is found in Spain and on Sardinia.

The wingspan is 21–22 mm.

References

Moths described in 1911
Crambinae
Moths of Europe